
Year 839 (DCCCXXXIX) was a common year starting on Wednesday (link will display the full calendar) of the Julian calendar.

Events 
 By place 
 Europe 
 Prince Sicard of Benevento is assassinated by a conspiracy among the nobility. He is succeeded by Radelchis I, chief army officer and treasurer of Sicard, who proclaims himself ruler of Benevento. He imprisons Siconulf, heir and brother of Sicard, in Taranto. But Amalfitan merchants, led by Landulf I, the gastald of Capua, and with the support of Guaifer, rescue him from prison. Siconulf is proclaimed prince of Salerno, and a civil war erupts, which splits the Lombard principality in Southern Italy.
 Third Civil War: King Louis the German, grandson of Charlemagne, invades Swabia. His nephew, Pepin II of Aquitaine, and his Gascon subjects, conquer territory all the way to the Loire.
 May 20 — Thirteen months before his death, Louis the Pious, successor to his father Charlemagne, consents to the division of Charlemagne's empire among his sons in a declaration at Worms.  Upon Louis I's death in 840, Lothair (age 45) is devised Middle Francia that includes Switzerland and northern Italy; Louis the German (Louis II), age 36, receives Eastern Francia that includes much of Germany; and Charles the Bald (17) gets West Francia that incorporates most of France.
 The Hungarians (also known as Magyars) who until then have lived east to the Carpathians, raid the Lower Danube at the request of the Bulgarian Empire against the Byzantine insurgents. 
 Approximate date – Danish Vikings return to ravage the Frisian coast (sacking Dorestad for the second time).

 Britain 
 King Egbert of Wessex dies after a 37-year reign, and is succeeded by his son Æthelwulf ("Noble Wolf") as ruler of Wessex. Æthelwulf's eldest son, Æthelstan, is made sub-king of Kent, Essex, Surrey and Sussex, under his father.
 Eóganan mac Óengusa, King of the Picts, his brother Bran, Áed mac Boanta, King of Dál Riata, "and others almost innumerable" are killed in a battle fought by the men of Fortriu in Scotland against Vikings. Alpín mac Echdach (Alpín II) apparently succeeds Áed.

 By topic 
 Religion 
 The first official mention of Andorra is recorded, in the manuscripts of the cathedral at La Seu d'Urgell (modern Spain).

Births 
 Charles the Fat, Frankish emperor (d. 888) 
 He Quanhao, general of the Tang Dynasty (d. 870)
 Liu Chongwang, chancellor of the Tang Dynasty (d. 900) 
 Muhammad ibn Jarir al-Tabari, Persian scholar (d. 923)

Deaths 
 Áed mac Boanta, king of Dál Riata
 Aznar I, king of Aragon
 Cathal mac Muirgiussa, king of Connacht
 Chengguan, Chinese Buddhist monk (b. 738)
 Cummascach mac Congalaig, king of Brega
 Egbert, king of Wessex
 Eóganan mac Óengusa, king of the Picts
 Ibrahim ibn al-Mahdi, Muslim prince (b. 779)
 Muhammad at-Taqi, Muslim ninth Ismā'īlī imam (or 840)
 Muiredach mac Eochada, king of Ulaid
 Pei Du, chancellor of the Tang Dynasty (b. 765)
 Rorgon I, count of Maine (or 840)
 Sicard, prince of Benevento
 Vache, prince of Kakheti
 Wiglaf, king of Mercia

References

Sources